The 2014 Copa del Rey de Baloncesto was the 78th edition of the Spanish King's Basketball Cup. It was managed by the ACB and was held in Málaga, in the Martín Carpena on February 6–9, 2014. Real Madrid won their 24th cup.

Qualified teams
The seven first qualified after the first half of the 2013–14 ACB regular season qualified to the tournament. As Unicaja, host team, finished between the seven first teams, the eighth qualified joined the Copa del Rey.

Draw
The 2014 Copa del Rey de Baloncesto was drawn on 27 January 2014 at approximately 12:00 CET and was broadcast live on YouTube and on TV in many countries. The seeded teams were paired in the quarterfinals with the non-seeded teams. There were not any restrictions for the draw of the semifinals. As in recent season, the first qualified team plays its quarterfinal game on Thursday.

Bracket

Quarterfinals

Semifinals

Final

References and notes

External links
Copa del Rey official website
Copa del Rey news

Copa del Rey de Baloncesto
2013–14 in Spanish basketball cups